Marla Hanson (born June 18, 1961) is an American screenwriter and ex-model who was the victim of a slashing attack instigated by her landlord in 1986.

Early life
Born in Independence, Missouri, Hanson graduated from Odessa High School in Odessa, Missouri, and attended  college at Southwestern Assemblies of God University in Waxahachie, Texas, a suburb of Dallas. After working as a real estate and insurance saleswoman, a job promotion brought her to New York City, where she took a part-time modeling job that eventually became her full-time career in the 1980s.

Attack
In June 1986, Hanson became involved in a dispute with her landlord, Steve Roth, over a security deposit that he owed her. She had also previously rejected his romantic advances. Roth hired two friends, Steven Bowman and Darren Norman, to attack Hanson.  Hanson testified that Roth asked her to step outside a bar, and then stood by while the two men, after announcing a "stick-up," slashed her face with a razor blade.  The assault left three wounds that required surgery and over 100 stitches to close, resulting in permanent scars.

Roth and the two attackers were tried separately, with Judge Jeffrey Atlas presiding over both trials.  In Roth's trial, a lawyer for Roth suggested that his breaking off of a long-term gay relationship with Bowman that day led Bowman to attack Hanson out of jealousy.  In Roth's trial, he was found guilty of first degree assault for arranging the attack.

In the trial of Bowman and Norman a few months later,
Hanson was subjected to a controversial cross examination by Bowman's defense attorney Alton H. Maddox, who impugned her character in a line of questioning the prosecutor called "disgusting and filthy".  Maddox also asserted that Hanson had "racial hangups" that led her to falsely identify Bowman and Norman, who are black, as her attackers. 
Hanson and her attorney later publicly criticized the criminal justice system for allowing her to be humiliated on the witness stand.  Bowman and Norman were found guilty.

At sentencing, Atlas gave Roth the 5 to 15 year maximum sentence,
but not before telling a weeping Hanson and her attorney he was "incensed" at their public criticism of the criminal justice system. After a brief recess, Atlas apologized to Hanson and her lawyer. Mayor Ed Koch expressed outrage at Atlas's comments. Bowman and Norman were sentenced to the 5 to 15 year maximum sentence as well.
 
Hanson has since lobbied for reform in the way victims of crimes are treated in criminal courts.

Screenwriter
Her works as a screenwriter include:

The Blackout (1997) 
Subway Stories (1997)

Personal life
In 1997, Hanson married Douglas Howell, whom she had met on a flight to Cuba a few months earlier. They have a daughter together.

In popular culture
The story of the attack on Hanson was made into a TV movie entitled The Marla Hanson Story in 1991 where she was portrayed by Cheryl Pollak.

Hanson was featured on episode 3 of the Netflix series Skin Decision: Before and After. She received numerous treatments to improve her skin.

References

External links
 
 

 

1961 births
Living people
Writers from Independence, Missouri
Female models from Missouri
American women screenwriters
Screenwriters from Missouri
Violence against women in the United States
21st-century American women